Acraea strattipocles is a butterfly in the family Nymphalidae. It is found on Madagascar.

Description

A. strattipocles Oberth. (56 f) is very similar to Acraea  igola, but has the discal dots of the hindwing much larger and completely developed and its inner margin whitish. Madagascar.

Biology
The habitat consists of forests.

Taxonomy
It is a member of the Acraea masamba species group  -   but see also Pierre & Bernaud, 2014

References

External links

Die Gross-Schmetterlinge der Erde 13: Die Afrikanischen Tagfalter. Plate XIII 56 f 
Images representing Acraea strattipocles at Bold

Butterflies described in 1893
strattipocles
Endemic fauna of Madagascar
Butterflies of Africa